The Adoration of the Magi is a painting by the Italian Renaissance painter Filippino Lippi. It is signed and dated at 1496. It is housed in the Uffizi of Florence.

The panel was painted for the Convent of San Donato in Scopeto, in substitution of the one commissioned in 1481 to Leonardo da Vinci, who left it unfinished. In 1529 it was acquired by Cardinal Carlo de' Medici and in 1666 it became part of the Uffizi collection.

Filippino Lippi followed Leonardo's setting, in particular in the central part of the work. Much of its inspiration was clearly derived from Botticelli's Adoration of the Magi, also in the Uffizi: this is evident in the disposition of the characters on the two sides, with the Holy Family portrayed in the centre under. Similarly to Botticelli's work, Filippino also portrayed numerous members of the Medici cadet line, who had adhered to the Savonarolian Republic in the period in which the work was executed. On the left, kneeling and holding an astrolabe, is Pierfrancesco de' Medici, who had died 20 years before. Behind him, standing, are his two sons Giovanni, holding a goblet, and Lorenzo, from whom a page is removing a crown.

The general style is that of Filippino's late career, characterized by a greater care to details and by a nervous rhythm in the forms, influenced by the knowledge of foreign painting schools (as also in the landscape of the background).

See also
Adoration of the Magi (Leonardo)
Adoration of the Magi (Botticelli, 1475)

References
Page at artonline.it 
Filippino Lippi - Adoration of the Magi at the Uffizi

1496 paintings
Paintings by Filippino Lippi
Paintings in the collection of the Uffizi
Lippi
Paintings by Filippino Lippi in the Uffizi
Cattle in art
Horses in art